Carry the Kettle 76-1 is an Indian reserve of the Carry the Kettle Nakoda First Nation in Saskatchewan. It is 21 kilometres north-east of Sintaluta.

The reserve is located near the south-west end of Katepwa Lake.

See also
List of Indian reserves in Saskatchewan

References

Indian reserves in Saskatchewan
Division No. 6, Saskatchewan